Dark-Ism is a 2005 album by the band Balzac.

Track listing
"Beyond Evil 308, Pt. 1"
"D.A.R.K."
"Blood Inside '68"
"Beyond Evil 308, Pt. 2"
"Gyakusatsu-No-Mukougawa"
"XXXxxx"
"I Can't Stand It Anymore"
"Yami-No-Hikari-E"

Credits
 Hirosuke - vocals
 Atsushi - guitar
 Akio - bass guitar
 Takayuki - drums

Balzac (band) albums
2005 albums